Samuel Henry "Errie" Ball (November 14, 1910July 2, 2014) was a Welsh-American professional golfer who competed at the inaugural Augusta National golf tournament in 1934 (now known as the Masters Tournament). He was the last living person to compete in the first Masters and died at the age of 103.

Early life
Ball was born in Bangor, Wales, in 1910. He acquired the nickname "Errie" from his family's French maid who was tasked with caring for him and performing household duties. She had trouble pronouncing "Henry", hence the name Errie. "My father’s name was William Henry Ball. Back in those days, Henry became 'Harry'," said Ball, prior to his 100th birthday party. “My mother, from what they tell me, didn’t like the fact that they would be calling my father Old Harry and me Young Harry. We had a French maid at that time, and she said, ‘Why don’t you call him ‘Errie?’ And I’ve gone by that ever since. I wouldn’t turn around if you called me Sam."

Ball’s connection to Bobby Jones began in 1930, when he met the famed Georgian at the Open Championship in Hoylake, England, where Jones would win one leg of his Grand Slam. The relationship continued the day Ball arrived in America—September 27, 1930—just as Jones clinched the Grand Slam with a victory in the U.S. Amateur.

Golf career
Ball's first job was serving for his uncle, Frank Ball, then the PGA head professional at East Lake Golf Club in Atlanta. Ball later assisted George Sargent, who became PGA of America president. In 1933, Ball received a letter of recommendation from Jones that elevated him to his first head professional post at Mobile (Alabama) Country Club.

Ball was still competitive even into his late 40s. At age 47—in the 1958 PGA Championship at Llanerch Country Club—he carded rounds of 79-72-72-73=296 and finished in a tie for 33rd place with Tom Talkington.

Ball served as the head professional at Oak Park Country Club in Chicago, Illinois, for many years. During the winter months he was the head professional at Tucson Country Club in Tucson, Arizona, where his tenure was 14 years, from 1951 through April 1, 1965. In September 1964, Tucson Country Club president Dr. George Bland stated that, "What we need is a full-time pro. The size of the club (about 700 members) dictates this necessity. We'll have a hard time replacing Errie—we're well aware of that."

Achievement awards
Ball was inducted into the Illinois Golf Hall of Fame in 1990. As of 2011, he was giving lessons at the Willoughby Golf Club in Stuart, Florida and he turned 100 on November 14, 2010. Golfweek magazine was on site when he celebrated this event with friends and members at Willoughby Golf Club and posted a story documenting the event. Ball was inducted into the PGA Hall of Fame in 2011.

Death and legacy
Ball, the last of the inaugural Masters field of 1934 and the PGA of America’s oldest and longest-serving member, died July 2, 2014 at Martin Hospital South in Stuart, Florida, surrounded by his family. He was 103.

Tournament wins
Note: This list may be incomplete.
1931 Southeastern Section PGA Championship
1932 Atlanta Open
1949 Illinois PGA Championship
1951 Arizona PGA
1952 Arizona PGA
1953 Illinois Open Championship
1954 Arizona Open
1955 Illinois PGA Match Play Championship, Illinois PGA Championship
1965 Illinois PGA Championship
Illinois PGA Senior Championship

Results in major championships

NYF = Tournament not yet founded
NT = No tournament
DNP = Did not play
CUT = missed the half-way cut (3rd round cut in 1960 PGA Championship)
R64, R32, R16, QF, SF = Round in which player lost in PGA Championship match play
"T" indicates a tie for a place
Yellow background for top-10

References

External links
Illinois Golf Hall of Fame profile

Welsh male golfers
American male golfers
Golfers from Florida
American centenarians
Welsh emigrants to the United States
Sportspeople from Bangor, Gwynedd
People from Stuart, Florida
1910 births
2014 deaths
Men centenarians